P18 is an electro-Latino music band formed with former Mano Negra members Daniel Jamet, Philippe Teboul and Thomas Darnal.

Albums 
 Electropica – 2002
 Urban Cuban – 1999
 P18 ¡ Los Mejores ! – 1999

Festivals
 Eurockéennes (1999)
 Couleur Café (1999, 2002)
 Caribana Festival (Switzerland) (2000)

External links
 Official site
 "Electropic Trouble," Miami New Times, July 4, 2002
 "Global Warming," Palo Alto Weekly, July 12, 2002
 "P18's 'Electropica' Storm, Making Afro-Cuban Waves," Washington Post, July 21, 2002

French electronic music groups
Latin music groups